Kakarhati is a town and a nagar panchayat in Panna district in the Indian state of Madhya Pradesh.

Demographics
 India census, Kakarhati had a population of 7096. Males constitute 53% of the population and females 47%. Kakarhati has an average literacy rate of 51%, lower than the national average of 59.5%: male literacy is 60%, and female literacy is 40%. In Kakarhati, 19% of the population is under 6 years of age.

References

Cities and towns in Panna district